Pasotti is an Italian surname. Notable people with the surname include:

Alfredo Pasotti (1925–2000), Italian cyclist
Giorgio Pasotti (born 1973), Italian actor

See also
Pasotti F.6 Airone, an Italian aircraft
Pasotti F.9 Sparviero, an Italian aircraft

Italian-language surnames